Katja Schuurman (born 19 February 1975) is a Dutch actress, singer and television personality.

Early life 
She grew up as the eldest daughter of a Dutch father and a Surinamese mother, born in Curaçao. Her sister Birgit is also a singer and actress.

Acting career

1992-1999
Schuurman made her acting debut in 1992 on the television series Uit de school geklapt. Her breakthrough came two years later when she resurfaced in the RTL soap Goede Tijden, Slechte Tijden (GTST) as Jessica, one of Govert Harmsen's three nieces.

With two other characters from GTST she formed the spin-off girl group Linda, Roos & Jessica. Their debut single "Ademnood" (English version: "Turn Your Love Around'") topped the Dutch charts in late 1995.

The only disappointment in this successful year was the release of De Zeemeerman (The Merman); it failed to draw people to the cinemas and was voted the worst Dutch movie ever made.

Katja continued to release singles with both LR&J and on her own. She had hits with Maar nu heb ik er een, Wereldmeid, Totaal Verkocht and Lover or friend.

By 1999 Schuurman had left the GTST-cast while LR&J disbanded after releasing their farewell single "1999 X".

2000-present
In 2000, Schuurman played Frida in the Salou-based movie Costa! and found herself reunited with Georgina Verbaan, who played her sister Hedwig in Goede Tijden, Slechte Tijden. Costa! premiered in 2001 and was successful enough to be adapted into a television series. Schuurman appeared in the first two seasons. She also appeared in the 2022 film Costa!!.

Schuurman went on to host programs for BNN (till 2008), NET5 (2008-2014) and KRO-NCRV (in particular for NCRV from 2014 onwards). In 2019, Schuurman returned to RTL.

Personal life
She married actor Thijs Römer (grandson of actor Piet Römer) in Vallery, France on August 8, 2006; their daughter Sammie was born on 22 April 2010. They divorced in February 2015.

In 2019 Schuurman married chef Freek van Noortwijk. In August 2020 they had a daughter, Schuurman's second child.

Filmography

Television series as herself
De Telebel Show (1996)
So 90's (1997–1999)
Fox Tours (1999–2000)
Katja ZKM (2001)
Top Of The Pops (2001–2004)
BNN At Work (2001–2005)
Lijst 0 (2002–2003)
Mission Unfindable (2003–2004)
BNN Family (2004)
BNN presenteert AVRO's Sterrenslag (2004–2005)
Prettig weekend ondanks alles (2005) (documentary about the murder of Theo van Gogh)
Try Before You Die (2005–2008)
Katja vs. Bridget (2005)
Ranking The Stars (2006)
Katja vs. de rest (2006–2007)
Get Smarter In A Week (2007)
Return to Sender (2007-) (documentary)
Katja & Sophie (2008)
Tafel van Vijf (2009)
Tussen de Oren (2009)
De Battle (2019)

Films
Poppycock (1995) (Short film)
De Zeemeerman (1996)
No Trains No Planes (1999)
Zeus (2001) (TV film)
Costa! (2001)
Oesters van Nam Kee (2002)
The Rules of Attraction (2002)
Interview (2003)
Cool! (2004)
Sextet (2006)
Interview (2007)
Kapitein Rob en het Geheim van Professor Lupardi (2007)
Het wapen van Geldrop (2009)
Black Out (2012)
Costa!! (2022)
Casa Coco (2022)

References

External links

Katja Schuurman at BNN

1975 births
Living people
Dutch film actresses
Dutch people of Curaçao descent
Dutch pop singers
Dutch television actresses
VJs (media personalities)
Dutch people of Surinamese descent
People from Bunnik
20th-century Dutch actresses
21st-century Dutch actresses
21st-century Dutch singers
21st-century Dutch women singers